John Johnson (1805February 5, 1867) was a Democratic U.S. Representative from Ohio for one term from 1851 to 1853.

Biography 
John Johnson was born near Dungannon in County Tyrone, Ireland. He came to the United States in 1816, and to Coshocton, Ohio in 1820. He learned the tanner's trade from his step-father, James Renfrew. He was a member of the merchandising and banking firm, W. K. Johnson & Co. He entered politics in 1843, serving in the Ohio Senate, then later as a delegate from Coshocton County to the Ohio state Constitutional Convention in 1850 and 1851. Later he served as a U.S. Representative for Ohio's 16th District from 1851 to 1853.

Family life
Johnson was a member of the Presbyterian church. He was married to Harriet Humrickhouse, and had no children.

Death
He is buried at Oakbridge Cemetery in Coshocton, Ohio.

References

External links

1805 births
1867 deaths
People from Coshocton, Ohio
Ohio Independents
Ohio state senators
Ohio Constitutional Convention (1850)
Irish emigrants to the United States (before 1923)
Politicians from County Tyrone
Ohio Democratic-Republicans
Democratic-Republican Party members of the United States House of Representatives
19th-century American politicians
Democratic Party members of the United States House of Representatives from Ohio